The men's heavyweight competition in kickboxing at the 2017 World Games took place from 26 to 27 July 2017 at the Orbita Hall in Wrocław, Poland.

Competition format
A total of 8 athletes entered the competition. They fought in the cup system.

Results

References 

 
2017 World Games